XHEEM-FM is a radio station on 94.5 FM in Ríoverde, San Luis Potosí. It carries a grupera format known as La M Mexicana.

History
XEEM-AM 880 received its concession on February 3, 1958 and was formally inaugurated 15 days later. It was owned by Carlos Martínez Guillén and broadcast as a daytimer with 1,000 watts. Later, power increased to 5,000 watts with 1,000 at night.

In 2011, XEEM was approved for AM-FM migration as XHEEM-FM 94.5.

References

Radio stations in San Luis Potosí
Radio stations established in 1958